The NHL's Southeast Division was formed in 1998 as part of the Eastern Conference due to expansion. The division lasted for 14 seasons (not including the cancelled 2004–05 season) until 2013. The division was intended to group teams primarily in the Southeastern United States. Its original members were the Carolina Hurricanes, Florida Panthers, Tampa Bay Lightning, and Washington Capitals. The expansion Atlanta Thrashers joined the division in 1999. The Thrashers' relocation to Winnipeg in 2011 to become the new Winnipeg Jets spurred talks for what became a league realignment in 2013; the Jets still played in the Southeast during the division's final two seasons.

Division lineups

1998–1999
 Carolina Hurricanes
 Florida Panthers
 Tampa Bay Lightning
 Washington Capitals

Changes from the 1997–98 season
 The Southeast Division is formed as a result of NHL realignment
 The Florida Panthers, Tampa Bay Lightning, and Washington Capitals come from the original Atlantic Division
 The Carolina Hurricanes come from the Northeast Division

1999–2011
 Atlanta Thrashers
 Carolina Hurricanes
 Florida Panthers
 Tampa Bay Lightning
 Washington Capitals

Changes from the 1998–99 season
 The Atlanta Thrashers are added as an expansion team
 The Carolina Hurricanes relocate to Raleigh from Greensboro

2011–2013
 Carolina Hurricanes
 Florida Panthers
 Tampa Bay Lightning
 Washington Capitals
 Winnipeg Jets

Changes from the 2010–11 season
 The Atlanta Thrashers relocate to Winnipeg, Manitoba, and become the new Winnipeg Jets

After the 2012–13 season
The NHL dissolved the Southeast Division as the league realigned into two conferences with two divisions each. The Winnipeg Jets moved to the Western Conference and the Central Division. The Florida Panthers and Tampa Bay Lightning were placed into the new Atlantic Division. The Carolina Hurricanes and Washington Capitals were placed in the newly formed Metropolitan Division.

Division champions
 1999 – Carolina Hurricanes (34–30–18, 86 pts)
 2000 – Washington Capitals (44–24–12–2, 102 pts)
 2001 – Washington Capitals (41–27–10–4, 96 pts)
 2002 – Carolina Hurricanes (35–26–16–5, 91 pts)
 2003 – Tampa Bay Lightning (36–25–16–5, 93 pts)
 2004 – Tampa Bay Lightning (46–22–8–6, 106 pts)
 2005 – no season (NHL Lockout)
 2006 – Carolina Hurricanes (52–22–8, 112 pts)
 2007 – Atlanta Thrashers (43–28–11, 97 pts)
 2008 – Washington Capitals (43–31–8, 94 pts)
 2009 – Washington Capitals (50–24–8, 108 pts)
 2010 – Washington Capitals (54–15–13, 121 pts)
 2011 – Washington Capitals (48–23–11, 107 pts)
 2012 – Florida Panthers (38–26–18, 94 pts)
 2013 – Washington Capitals (26–18–2, 54 pts)

Season results

Notes
 The 2012–13 NHL season was shortened to 48 games due to the lockout.

Stanley Cup winners produced
 2004 – Tampa Bay Lightning
 2006 – Carolina Hurricanes

Presidents' Trophy winners produced
 2010 – Washington Capitals

Southeast Division titles won by team

References

 NHL History

 
National Hockey League divisions